The Band Perry is an American band. Their discography comprises two studio albums, four extended plays and fourteen singles, for ten of which a music video has been filmed. The group's two albums were released on Republic Nashville before their split with the label in 2016.

Studio albums

Extended plays

Singles

Notes

Other charted songs

Music videos

Other appearances

References 

Country music discographies
Discographies of American artists
Pop music group discographies